Nebulosa cistrina is a moth of the family Notodontidae. It is found in south-eastern Ecuador.

References

Moths described in 1899
Notodontidae of South America